Barbara W. Leyden (18 December 1949 – 4 February 2006) was an American palynologist and paleoecologist.

Leyden earned her Ph.D. from Indiana University in 1982. She conducted her research and taught at University of South Florida and frequently wrote about climate change in the late Pleistocene era in the western hemisphere.

External links 
Barbara Leyden website via University of South Florida

2006 deaths
Indiana University alumni
University of South Florida faculty
1949 births